Faqir Dad Khoso is a Pakistani politician who had been a Member of the Provincial Assembly of Sindh, from May 2013 to May 2018.

Early life and education
He was born on 8 August 1957 in Jamshoro.

He has a Bachelors of Arts degree from Sindh University.

Political career

He was elected to the Provincial Assembly of Sindh as a candidate of Pakistan Peoples Party from Constituency PS-72 Jamshoro-II in 2013 Pakistani general election.

References

Living people
Sindh MPAs 2013–2018
1957 births
Pakistan People's Party politicians